Lithophane tepida, the luke-warm pinion moth, is a species of cutworm or dart moth in the family Noctuidae. It is found in North America.

The MONA or Hodges number for Lithophane tepida is 9909.

References

Further reading

 
 
 

tepida
Articles created by Qbugbot
Moths described in 1874